M. C. Taylor was an American football coach.  He was the first head football coach at Richmond College—now known as the University of Richmond—serving for one season, in 1881, and compiling record of 2–0. Taylor was among the first to coach a college football team.

Head coaching record

References

Year of birth missing
Year of death missing
Richmond Spiders football coaches